Horaiclavus is a genus of sea snails, marine gastropod mollusks in the family Horaiclavidae.

Horaiclavus is the type genus of the family Horaiclavidae.

It was previously included within the subfamily Crassispirinae, family Turridae.

Species
Species within the genus Horaiclavus include:
 Horaiclavus adenensis Bonfitto & Morassi, 2014
 Horaiclavus anaimus Sysoev in Fedosov & Kantor, 2008
 Horaiclavus filicinctus (Smith E. A., 1882)
 Horaiclavus julieae Stahlschmidt, Poppe & Tagaro, 2018
 Horaiclavus kilburni Stahlschmidt, 2015
 Horaiclavus madurensis (Schepman, 1913)
 Horaiclavus micans Kantor, Fedosov & Puillandre, 2018
 Horaiclavus ordinei Bonfitto & Morassi, 2014
 Horaiclavus phaeocercus Sysoev in Fedosov & Kantor, 2008
 Horaiclavus pulchellus Stahlschmidt, Poppe & Tagaro, 2018
 Horaiclavus splendidus (Adams A., 1867)
 Horaiclavus stenocyma Kuroda, Habe & Oyama, 1971
 Horaiclavus sysoevi Smriglio & Mariottini, 2003
Species brought into synonymy
 Horaiclavus multicostatus (Schepman, 1913): synonym of Anguloclavus multicostatus (Schepman, 1913)

References

 Kuroda, T.; Habe, T.; Oyama, K. (1971). The sea shells of Sagami Bay. Maruzen Co., Tokyo. xix, 1-741 (Japanese text), 1-489 (English text), 1-51 (Index), pls 1-121

External links
 Bonfitto, Antonio, and Mauro Morassi. "Two new Horaiclavus (Horaiclavidae, Conoidea) species from the Indo-Pacific region." Zootaxa 3821.1 (2014): 146-150
  Tucker, J.K. 2004 Catalog of recent and fossil turrids (Mollusca: Gastropoda). Zootaxa 682:1-1295.µ
 Bouchet, P.; Kantor, Y. I.; Sysoev, A.; Puillandre, N. (2011). A new operational classification of the Conoidea (Gastropoda). Journal of Molluscan Studies. 77(3): 273-308

 
Horaiclavidae
Gastropod genera